The 1985 Toledo Rockets football team was an American football team that represented the University of Toledo in the Mid-American Conference (MAC) during the 1985 NCAA Division I-A football season. In their fourth season under head coach Dan Simrell, the Rockets compiled a 4–7 record (3–6 against MAC opponents), finished in a tie for sixth place in the MAC, and were outscored by all opponents by a combined total of 187 to 135.

The team's statistical leaders included A. J. Sager with 1,335 passing yards, Kelvin Farmer with 748 rushing yards, and Jay Walsh with 284 receiving yards.

Schedule

References

Toledo
Toledo Rockets football seasons
Toledo Rockets football